Keith Hart (born in Manchester, England) is a British anthropologist and writer living in Paris. His main research has focused on economic anthropology, Africa and the African diaspora, and money. He has taught at universities including East Anglia, Manchester, Yale and the Chicago, as well as at Cambridge University where he was director of the African Studies Centre. He contributed the concept of the informal economy to development studies and has published widely on economic anthropology. He is the author of The Memory Bank: Money in an Unequal World and Self in the World: Connecting Life's Extremes. His written work focuses on the national limits of politics in a globalised economy.

Early life and education
Hart was born in Manchester  and attended Manchester Grammar School. He later studied at Cambridge University. He started as classicist before switching to the anthropology of religion, and then studied his PhD at Cambridge in migrant politics in Ghana.

Prickly Pear Pamphlets
In 1993, Keith Hart and Anna Grimshaw started a small press called Prickly Pear. Together, they published a series of ten pamphlets. "We emulate the passionate amateurs of history who circulated new and radical ideas to as wide an audience as possible," they said. "And we hope in the process to reinvent anthropology as a means of engaging with society." In 2001, Prickly Paradigm established itself as a new incarnation of Prickly Pear with Marshall Sahlins as publisher.

Open Anthropology Cooperative
Open Anthropology Cooperative was a social networking site for anthropologists founded by Keith Hart in June 2009 on the Ning. It acquired 8,000 members worldwide in its first decade and opened on Facebook, making a total membership of 22,000 members drawn from professional academics, postgraduates, undergraduates and amateur anthropologists.

Books
The Political Economy of West African Agriculture (1982)
The Memory Bank: Money in an Unequal World (2000)
The Hit Man’s Dilemma: Or Business, Personal and Impersonal (2005)
Market and Society: The Great Transformation Today (edited with Chris Hann) (2009)
The Human Economy: A Citizen's Guide (edited with Jean-Louis Laville and Antonio David Cattani) (2010)
Economic Anthropology: History, Ethnography, Critique (with Chris Hann) (2011)
People, Money and Power in the Economic Crisis: Perspectives from the Global South (edited with John Sharp) (2014)
Economy For and Against Democracy (editor) (2015)
Money in a Human Economy (editor) (2017)
Self in the World: Connecting Life's Extremes (2022)

References

British anthropologists
Economic anthropologists
Living people
1943 births
Academic staff of the University of Pretoria
Academics of Goldsmiths, University of London
Academics of the London School of Economics
Academics of the University of Cambridge